Brian Winters is an American former soccer player who played professionally in the USL A-League

Education
Winters graduated from Bellarmine Preparatory School. He attended the University of Portland from 1996 to 1999.

Club
He attended the University of Portland, playing on the men's soccer team from 1996 to 1999.  In the summer of 1999, he also played for the Willamette Valley Firebirds of the USL Premier Development League.  In February 2000, the Columbus Crew selected Winters in the third round (33rd overall) of the 2000 MLS SuperDraft.  The Crew released him during the pre-season and Winters signed with the Minnesota Thunder of the USL A-League.  In 2001, he returned to Portland when he joined the Portland Timbers, playing for them until 2005.

International
In 1999, Winters earned ten caps with the United States men's national under-23 soccer team as they took third at the 1999 Pan American Games.

Post-Soccer Career
Winters graduated from Oregon Health Sciences University School of Medicine in 2011. He completed his Urology residency at the University of Washington School of Medicine in 2012-2018.

External links
 Soccertimes: Brian Winters

References

Living people
1977 births
American soccer players
Minnesota Thunder players
Portland Pilots men's soccer players
Portland Timbers (2001–2010) players
United States men's under-23 international soccer players
A-League (1995–2004) players
USL League Two players
Willamette Valley Firebirds players
USL First Division players
Soccer players from Tacoma, Washington
Columbus Crew draft picks
Association football defenders
Association football midfielders
Pan American Games bronze medalists for the United States
Footballers at the 1999 Pan American Games
Pan American Games medalists in football
Medalists at the 1999 Pan American Games